Svante Samuelsson (born 4 September 1972) is a retired Swedish football midfielder.

References

1972 births
Living people
Swedish footballers
Kalmar FF players
Örgryte IS players
SK Brann players
AIK Fotboll players
Association football midfielders
Swedish expatriate footballers
Expatriate footballers in Norway
Swedish expatriate sportspeople in Norway
Allsvenskan players
Eliteserien players
Sweden international footballers
People from Kungälv Municipality
Sportspeople from Västra Götaland County